Luke Connolly (born 2 November 1992) is an Irish Gaelic footballer who plays for Cork Senior Championship club Nemo Rangers. He is a former member of the Cork senior football team. Connolly usually lines out as a forward.

Playing career

Coláiste Chríost Rí

Connolly first came to football prominence as a student in Coláiste Chríost Rí in Cork. In his final year with the school he won a Corn Uí Mhuirí medal after a "prolific" performance at full-forward in a 1-12 to 1-07 win over Pobalscoil Chorca Dhuibhne in the final.

University College Cork

During his studies at University College Cork, Connolly was selected for the college's senior football team. On 22 February 2014, he won a Sigerson Cup medal after lining out at centre-forward in the 0-10 to 0-09 win over Ulster University in the final.

Nemo Rangers

Connolly joined the nemo Rangers club at a young age and played in all grades at juvenile and underage levels. He first enjoyed success with the club's under-21 team, claiming a Cork County U21AFC after top-scoring with 1-04 in the 2-13 to 0-05 win over Bantry Blues in the 2012 final. By this stage Connolly had already joined the Nemo Rangers senior team, having made his debut in a 0-12 to 1-07 win over Ballincollig in the first round of the 2011 Cork County Championship.

On 25 October 2015, Connolly won his first County Senior Championship medal after lining out at full-forward in the 1-10 to 0-11 defeat of Castlehaven in the final replay. He again lined out in the forwards when Nemo suffered a 1-07 to 0-09 defeat by Clonmel Commercials in the 2015 Munster club final.

Connolly won a second county championship winners' medal after scoring 1-01 from right corner-forward in the 4-12 to 3-13 win over St. Finbarr's in the 2017 county final. He later claimed his first Munster Club Championship medal after top-scoring with ten points in the 0-16 to 0-11 defeat of Dr. Crokes in the 2017 Munster club final. On 17 March 2018, Connolly again top scored for Nemo when they suffered a 2-19 to 0-10 defeat by Corofin in the 2018 All-Ireland club final.

On 27 October 2019, Connolly claimed a third county championship winners' medal after a 2-08 to 0-10 win over Duhallow in the county final. He later won a second Munster Club Championship medal after top-scoring for Nemo in the 0-15 to 0-06 win over Clonmel Commercials in the 2019 Munster club final.

Cork

Connolly first played for Cork when he was added to the minor panel in advance of the 2010 Munster Minor Championship. After winning a Munster Minor Championship medal as a non-playing substitute after a 1-08 to 1-07 win over Kerry, Connolly made his only appearance in the grade when he came on as a substitute in the 1-13 to 1-12 defeat by Tyrone in the 2010 All-Ireland minor final.

After progressing onto the Cork under-21, Connolly won a Munster Championship title in that grade after a 2-14 to 1-17 extra-time defeat of Kerry in the 2012 Munster under-21 final. He collected a second successive provincial winners' medal after a 1-17 to 0-09 win over Tipperary in the 2013 decider. On 14 May 2013, Connolly was held scoreless from left corner-forward when Cork suffered a 1-14 to 1-11 defeat by Galway in the 2013 All-Ireland under-21 final.

Connolly was added to the Cork senior training panel prior to the start of the 2015 National League. He made his first appearance for the team on 1 February 2015 when he came on as a 66th-minute substitute for Colm O'Driscoll in a 1-15 to 0-16 win over Dublin.

On 2 July 2017, Connolly made his first Munster final appearance when he was selected at full-forward against Kerry. He scored two points, including one from a free, but ended the game on the losing side after a 1-23 to 0-15 defeat.

Career statistics

Club

Inter-county

Honours

Coláiste Chríost Rí
Corn Uí Mhuirí: 2011

University College Cork
Sigerson Cup: 2014

Nemo Rangers
Munster Senior Club Football Championship: 2017, 2019
Cork Premier Senior Football Championship: 2015, 2017, 2019, 2020

Cork
National Football League Division 3: 2020
Munster Under-21 Football Championship: 2012, 2013
Munster Minor Football Championship: 2010

References

External link
Luke Connolly profile at the Cork GAA website

1992 births
Living people
UCC Gaelic footballers
Nemo Rangers Gaelic footballers
Cork inter-county Gaelic footballers
People educated at Coláiste Chríost Rí